Claudealia Bernice Robinson (February 28, 1927 – October 14, 2019) was an American hurdler. She competed in the women's 80 metres hurdles at the 1948 Summer Olympics.

After the Olympics she moved to Cleveland.  She continued to compete in Masters athletics under her married name of Bernice Robinson Holland as a thrower.  In 1986, she was inducted into the Greater Cleveland Hall of Fame. Bernice was voted to the USATF Masters Hall of Fame in 2001.

References

External links
 

1927 births
2019 deaths
Athletes (track and field) at the 1948 Summer Olympics
American female hurdlers
American female high jumpers
Olympic track and field athletes of the United States
Track and field athletes from Chicago
American masters athletes
21st-century American women
20th-century American women